The men's team recurve competition at the 2015 World Archery Championships took place from 26 July to 2 August in Copenhagen, Denmark.

A record 62 countries entered the full quota of 3 archers into the qualification round, thus becoming eligible for the team competition. The combined totals of the 3 archers from each country in the qualification round were added together, and the 16 teams with the highest combined scores competed in the elimination rounds.

Countries reaching the quarterfinals earned a team qualification spot (and corresponding 3 individual qualifying spots) for the 2016 Summer Olympics.

Schedule
All times are UTC+01:00.

Qualification round
Pre-tournament world rankings ('WR') are taken from the 18 July 2015 World Archery Rankings.

 Qualified for eliminations

Elimination rounds

References

2015 World Archery Championships